Pidlyssia is a village (selo) in Zolochiv Raion, Lviv Oblast, of Western Ukraine. It belongs to Zolochiv urban hromada, one of the hromadas of Ukraine.
Area of the village totals is 0,948 km2 and the population of village is just about 297 persons. Local government is administered by Bilokaminska village council.

Geography 

History 
The first written mention of the village dates from the 1550 year.  Parish school was opened in the village in 1866.

Cultural heritage 
Architectural monuments of the Zolochiv Raion are located in the village Pidlyssia:
 Church of the Transfiguration (Wooden), 1735 (sign. 1365).
 Farmstead of Markiyan Shashkevych, 1811.

Famous people 
 Markiyan Shashkevych – born November 6, 1811 in the village Pidlyssia. He was a priest of the Ukrainian Greek-Catholic Church, a poet, a translator, and the leader of the literary revival in Right Bank Ukraine.

References

External links 
 village Pidlyssia
 Pidlyssia, Zolochivs'kyi district
Villages in Zolochiv Raion, Lviv Oblast